James Round  (6 April 1842 – 25 December 1916) was a British Conservative politician and first-class cricketer.

Round was born at Colchester, the son of Rev. James Thomas Round and his wife Louisa Barlow. His father was Rector of St. Runwald's and St. Nicholas, Colchester, and prebendary of Broomesbury. Round was educated at Eton College and  Christ Church, Oxford. He played cricket for Oxford University in 1864, and for Marylebone Cricket Club (MCC) from 1865 to 1869. He played 34 innings in 22 first-class matches with a highest score of 142 and an average of 16.85. Round played for a number of clubs and additional sides including Gentlemen of Essex, Bishops Stortford, Chelmsford, I Zingari, Lord Sandwich's Eleven and pre-first-class Essex sides.

In 1867 Round inherited Birch Hall, Essex from his uncle Charles Gray Round, MP for North Essex. In 1868 he was elected Member of Parliament (MP) for East Essex. He played cricket for Houses of Parliament teams in 1879. When the seat was reorganised in 1885, he was elected as MP for Harwich, and held the seat until 1906. He was sworn of the Imperial Privy Council on 11 August 1902, following an announcement of the King's intention to make this appointment in the 1902 Coronation Honours list published in June that year.

Round was also a Justice of the Peace and alderman for Essex County Council. Round died at Birch Hall at the age of 74.

His son Charles Round played cricket for Essex.

References

External links 
 

1842 births
1916 deaths
Alumni of Christ Church, Oxford
Conservative Party (UK) MPs for English constituencies
English cricketers
English justices of the peace
Gentlemen cricketers
Members of Essex County Council
Members of the Privy Council of the United Kingdom
People educated at Eton College
Oxford University cricketers
UK MPs 1868–1874
UK MPs 1874–1880
UK MPs 1880–1885
UK MPs 1885–1886
UK MPs 1886–1892
UK MPs 1892–1895
UK MPs 1895–1900
UK MPs 1900–1906
Gentlemen of the South cricketers
Marylebone Cricket Club cricketers
Southgate cricketers
English cricketers of 1864 to 1889
Gentlemen of Marylebone Cricket Club cricketers